Gregory Stephen Perkins (born 28 December 1964), better known by his stage name Tex Perkins, is an Australian singer-songwriter who fronted the Australian rock band The Cruel Sea, but has also performed with the Beasts of Bourbon, Thug, James Baker Experience, The Butcher Shop, Salamander Jim, and Tex, Don and Charlie. He has also released many solo records. In 1997, a portrait of Tex Perkins by artist Bill Leak won the Packing Room award at the Archibald Prize.

Career

1980s: Early Groups
Perkins started his musical career in Brisbane cowpunk outfit Tex Deadly and the Dum-Dums, before moving to Sydney in 1982, garnering considerable attention in the Sydney independent music scene and also touring Melbourne, before the departure of guitarist Mark Halstead ended the band.

He later formed Salamander Jim with Kim Salmon from The Scientists and Richard Ploog from The Church. Due to touring commitments for Ploog & Salmon, Perkins formed a different line up with Stu Spasm, Lachlan McLeod and Martin Bland. In 1985 this line-up recorded and released their only record, an EP titled Lorne Greene Shares His Precious Fluids on Red Eye Records.

Perkins and Peter Read formed Thug in Sydney in 1987 when Read's flatmate had a fascination for collecting and amassing electronic equipment. After using some of the gear on initial recordings in Read's home studio, Perkins was eager to take it to the stage. Thug's live sets would last twenty to twenty-five minutes, featuring dancers and theatrics. Thug released two studio albums Mechanical Ape / Proud Idiots Parade in 1987 and Electric Woolly Mammoth in 1988.

1983–present: The Beasts of Bourbon 

Beasts of Bourbon formed in Sydney in 1983. The original lineup comprised Perkins, Spencer P. Jones, James Baker, Kim Salmon and Boris Sudjovic. The band's first album, The Axeman's Jazz, was an underground success, but the group continued to be just a side project until 1988 when it reformed to record Sour Mash, followed by 1990's Black Milk and 1991's The Low Road. In 1993, the group toured extensively to support the double album From the Belly of the Beasts, then disbanded temporarily. It reformed to record Gone in 1997, which received lukewarm reviews, but produced a somewhat successful single, "Saturated".

In 2003, the group reformed again to record a live album, Low Life, released on Spooky Records. In December 2006 it was announced that Albert Productions had signed an exclusive worldwide recording deal with the band and on 23 April 2007, released a new album Little Animals. In August 2013 the band celebrated its 30th anniversary.

1987–2003: The Cruel Sea 

After toying with different band members, The Cruel Sea came into fruition in 1987 as Ken Gormley on bass, Jim Elliot on drums, Danny Rumour on guitars and James Cruikshank on keyboards and guitars. They took their name from a recording by the 1960s surf instrumental group, The Ventures. In 1989 Perkins (their then-lighting technician) started joining them onstage. This sparked an interest from Red Eye Records, and the band was signed and released a 1989 album Down Below. It received an ARIA Award nomination in 1993 following the release of a second album, This Is Not the Way Home in 1991.

The group's third album, The Honeymoon Is Over, released in 1993, and its title song, won five ARIA Music Awards of 1994. The Cruel Sea followed with a high-profile world tour. 1995 saw the release of the hugely successful Three Legged Dog album, which won the group another ARIA award. In 1998, The Cruel Sea released Over Easy in 1997 and Where There's Smoke in 2001.

1992–present: Tex, Don and Charlie

Tex, Don and Charlie is an Australian group formed by Tex Perkins, Don Walker from Cold Chisel and guitarist Charlie Owen. Their first album Sad But True was released in 1993. Their distinctively Australian country-blues cocktail was reflected in their live album of 1995, Monday Morning Coming Down.... In March 2005, Tex, Don and Charlie released their second studio album All is Forgiven and a third, You Don't Know Lonely in 2017. All four albums have charted in the ARIA top 100.

2000-2015: Dark Horses 

The Dark Horses band arose from the writing, recording and touring for the Dark Horses album (Slick/Grudge, 1592612). Members were initially Charlie Owen, Joel Silbersher, Murray Paterson and Jim Elliott. Later members include Richard Needham, Gus Agars, James Cruikshank and Steve Hadley.

Sweet Nothing (Slick/Grudge, 0384961) credited to Tex Perkins' Dark Horses, was released in 2003 followed by Tex Perkins & The Dark Horses (Dark Horse Records/Inertia DHR001) in 2011. Everyone's Alone (Dark Horse Records/Inertia DHR002) was released in 2012 and Tunnel at the End of the Light (Dark Horse Records/Inertia DHR003) in 2015.

1996–present: Solo Career 
In 1996, Perkins released his first solo studio album, Far Be It from Me, which peaked at number 43 on the ARIA Charts. In 2000, Perkins released his second solo studio album, Dark Horses which peaked at number 24 on the ARIA Charts. In 2003, Sweet Nothing was released which was credited to Tex Perkins' Dark Horses and peaked at number 34 on the ARIA Charts.

In 2006, Perkins worked with Tim Rogers and released the album My Better Half and credited it TnT. The album peaked at number 31 on the ARIA Charts.

In 2008, Perkins released the album No. 1's & No. 2's, credited to Tex Perkins And His Ladyboyz. In 2009, with Dr Murray Paterson, he wrote the soundtrack to the Australian drama film Beautiful Kate. The album received an ARIA nomination for Best Original Soundtrack/Cast/Show Album for the soundtrack at the ARIA Music Awards of 2009.

In 2010 and 2011, Tex Perkins and The Tennessee Four (Shannon Bourne, guitar; Shane Reilly, guitar; Steve Hadley, bass; Dave Folley, drums) performed a series of shows in Australia and New Zealand, titled The Man in Black – The Johnny Cash Story, the show featured two hours of Johnny Cash’s music interwoven with the story of his rise to stardom, his fight for survival and his eventual redemption. Tex Perkins (a baritone, as was Cash) and Rachael Tidd (as Cash's wife June Carter Cash), performed faithful renditions of Cash's songs while telling Cash's story in the third person between songs. During the show, Tex humorously emphasises the name of Cash's guitarist Luther Perkins. Tex Perkins and The Tennessee Four performed a further series of shows in 2013 and 2014.

On 10 June 2011, Tex Perkins & The Dark Horses released a new, self-titled album which peaked at number 73.  Everyone's Alone was released in 2012 followed by Tunnel at the End of the Light in July 2015 and peaked at number 52.

In 2015, Perkins collaboration with The Steel Springs on "One Minute's Silence", released on Anzac Day, to commemorate the centenary of the landing at Anzac Cove. The track, written by author Matthew Hardy, features The Welsh Choir and a spoken word performance by Australian rules football legend Ron Barassi.

Film and TV appearances
Perkins has a cameo role in the 1998 Australian film, Praise. He appeared on Battle of the Choirs on the Seven Network in Australia in 2008. He has hosted RocKwiz numerous times. He voiced a cartoon shark in the 2011 Movie Extra animated series Shaaark.

Personal life
Perkins is a supporter of the St Kilda Football Club in the Australian Football League. He invented the sport of zoneball, a cross between Australian rules football and tennis. According to AFL player Bob Murphy, "Tex is to zoneball what Tom Wills is to footy ... The creator, the maestro, the master of ceremonies."

Discography

Studio albums

Live album

Soundtrack album

Compilation albums

Video albums

Awards and nominations

AIR Awards
The Australian Independent Record Awards (commonly known informally as AIR Awards) is an annual awards night to recognise, promote and celebrate the success of Australia's Independent Music sector.

! 
|-
| 2022
| Tex Perkins & The Fat Rubber Band
| Best Independent Country Album or EP
| 
|

ARIA Music Awards
The ARIA Music Awards are annual awards, which recognises excellence, innovation, and achievement across all genres of Australian music. They commenced in 1987.

|-
| rowspan="3" | 1994 || Sad But True || ARIA Award for Best Male Artist ||  
|-
| "The Honeymoon Is Over" (written by James Cruickshank, Tex Perkins, Dan Rumour) || rowspan="2" | ARIA Award for Song of the Year || 
|-
| "Black Stick" (written by James Cruickshank, Tex Perkins, Dan Rumour)|| 
|-
| 1996 || "You're Too Beautiful" || Best Male Artist ||  
|-
| 1997 ||Far Be It from Me || Best Male Artist ||  
|-
| 2001 ||Dark Horses || Best Male Artist ||  
|-
| 2003 ||Sweet Nothing || Best Male Artist ||  
|-
| 2009 || Beautiful Kate (with Murray Paterson)|| ARIA Award for Best Original Soundtrack, Cast or Show Album ||  
|-
| rowspan="2" | 2011 || The Man in Black || ARIA Award for Best Independent Release ||  
|-
| Tex Perkins & the Dark Horses || ARIA Award for Best Independent Release ||  
|-

EG Awards / Music Victoria Awards
The EG Awards (known as Music Victoria Awards since 2013) are an annual awards night celebrating Victorian music. They commenced in 2006.

|-
| EG Awards of 2009
| Tex Perkins
| Best Male
| 
|-

References

External links

1964 births
ARIA Award winners
Living people
Australian male singers
Australian rock singers
Australian multi-instrumentalists
People from Darwin, Northern Territory
Tex, Don and Charlie members
Beasts of Bourbon members